This is a list of notable Hong Kong exchange-traded funds, or ETFs.

Equity ETFs

Futures Based 
 3097.HK Mirae Asset Horizons S&P Crude Oil Futures Enhanced ER ETF - tracks the S&P GSCI Crude Oil Enhanced Index Excess Return
 3124.HK Samsung HSI Futures ETF - tracks the HSI Futures Index
 3134.HK Samsung HSI Futures RMB FX ETF - tracks the HSI Futures RMB FX Index
 3135.HK CSOP WTI Oil Annual Roll December Futures ER ETF - tracks the BofA Merrill Lynch Commodity index eXtra CLA Index (Excess Return)
 3175.HK Samsung S&P GSCI Crude Oil ER Futures ETF – tracks the S&P GSCI Crude Oil Index (Excess Return)

Physical 
 2800.HK Tracker Fund of Hong Kong (TraHK) – tracks the Hang Seng Index
 2801.HK iShares MSCI China Index ETF – tracks the MSCI China Index
 2802.HK iShares MSCI Emerging Asia Index ETF – tracks the MSCI EM Asia Index
 (Delisted) 2805.HK Vanguard FTSE Asia ex Japan Index ETF – tracks the FTSE Asia Pacific ex Japan, Australia and New Zealand Index
 2817.HK W.I.S.E. – CSI HK Listed Mainland Consumption Tracker - tracks the CSI Hong Kong Listed Tradable Mainland Consumption Index
 2822.HK CSOP FTSE China A50 ETF - tracks the FTSE China A50 Index
 2824.HK Lippo Select HK & Mainland Property ETF -tracks the Lippo Select HK & Mainland Property Index
 2825.HK W.I.S.E. - CSI HK 100 Tracker - tracks the CSI HK 100 Index
 2828.HK Hang Seng H-Share ETF – tracks the Hang Seng China Enterprises Index
 2832.HK Bosera FTSE China A50 Index ETF - tracks the FTSE China A50 Index
 2833.HK Hang Seng HSI ETF – tracks the Hang Seng Index
 2835.HK Horizons KOSPI 200 ETF - tracks the KOSPI 200 Index
 2836.HK SENSEXINDIA ETF – tracks the BSE Sensitivity Index
 2838.HK Hang Seng FTSE China 50 Index ETF – tracks the FTSE China 50 Index
 2839.HK W.I.S.E. – CSI HK Listed Mainland Real Estate Tracker - tracks the CSI Hong Kong Listed Tradable Mainland Real Estate Index
 3002.HK Polaris Taiwan Top 50 Tracker Fund – tracks the FTSE TWSE Taiwan 50 Index
 3008.HK C-Shares CSI 300 Index ETF - tracks the CSI 300 Index
 3010.HK iShares MSCI Asia APEX 50 Index ETF - tracks the MSCI Asia APEX 50 Index
 3012.HK AMUNDI Hang Seng HK 35 Index ETF - tracks the AMUNDI Hang Seng HK 35 Index ETF
 3021.HK CSOP MSCI T50 ETF - tracks the MSCI China and USA Internet Top 50 Equal Weighted Index
 3024.HK W.I.S.E. - SSE 50 China Tracker - tracks the SSE 50 Index
 3040.HK Horizons MSCI China ETF - tracks the MSCI China Index
 3041.HK Value Korea ETF - tracks the FTSE Value-Stocks Korea Index
 3043.HK db x-trackers MSCI PACIFIC EX JAPAN INDEX UCITS ETF (DR) - tracks the MSCI Pacific ex Japan TRN Index
 3046.HK Value China ETF - tracks the FTSE Value-Stocks China Index 
 3048.HK db x-trackers MSCI BRAZIL INDEX UCITS ETF (DR) - tracks the MSCI Total Return Net Brazil Index
 3056.HK Horizons S&P Global Consumer Brands ETF - tracks the S&P Global Consumer Enterprises Index
 3060.HK Value Taiwan ETF – tracks the FTSE Value-Stocks Taiwan Index
 3067.HK iShares Hang Seng TECH ETF – tracks the Hang Seng TECH Index
 3070.HK Ping An of China CSI HK Dividend ETF – tracks the CSI Hong Kong Dividend Index
 3072.HK Nikko AM Global Internet ETF – tracks the iEdge-Factset Global Internet Index 
 3084.HK Value Japan ETF - tracks the FTSE Value-Stocks Japan Index
 (Delisted) 3085.HK Vanguard FTSE Asia ex Japan High Dividend Yield Index ETF - tracks the FTSE Asia Pacific ex Japan, Australia and New Zealand High Dividend Yield Index
 3086.HK BMO NASDAQ 100 ETF - tracks the Nasdaq 100 Index
 3095.HK Value China A-Share ETF - tracks the FTSE Value-Stocks China A-Share Index
 (Delisted) 3098.HK Ping An of China CSI RAFI HK50 ETF – tracks the CSI RAFI Hong Kong 50 Index
 3100.HK E Fund CSI 100 A-Share Index ETF – tracks the CSI 100 Index
 (Delisted) 3101.HK Vanguard FTSE Developed Europe Index ETF - tracks the FTSE Developed Europe Index
 (Delisted) 3102.HK XIE Shares CLSA GARY ETF - tracks the CLSA GARY Net Total Return Index
 3110.HK Horizons Hang Seng High Dividend Yield ETF - tracks the Hang Seng High Dividend Yield Index
 3118.HK Harvest MSCI China A Index ETF - tracks the MSCI China A Index
 3120.HK E Fund CES China 120 Index ETF - tracks the CES China 120 Index
 3121.HK BMO MSCI Asia Pacific Real Estate ETF - tracks the MSCI AC Asia Pacific Real Estate Index
 (Delisted) 3126.HK Vanguard FTSE Japan Index ETF - tracks the FTSE Japan Index
 3127.HK Horizons CSI300 Real Estate Index ETF – tracks the CSI 300 Index
 3128.HK Hang Seng China A Industry Top Index ETF - tracks the Hang Seng China A Industry Top Index
 3129.HK CSOP China CSI 300 smart ETF - tracks the China CSI 300 smart Index
 (Delisted) 3140.HK Vanguard S&P 500 Index ETF – tracks the S&P 500 Index
 3143.HK BMO Hong Kong Banks ETF – tracks the NASDAQ Hong Kong Banks Index
 3145.HK BMO Asia High Dividend ETF – tracks the NASDAQ Asia ex Japan Dividend Achievers Index
 3147.HK CSOP SZSE ChiNext ETF  – tracks the SZSE ChiNext Index
 3150.HK Harvest CSI Smallcap 500 Index ETF  – tracks the CSI Smallcap 500 Index
 3156.HK GFI MSCI China A International ETF  – tracks the MSCI China A International Index
 3157.HK ChinaAMC Hang Seng SmallCap Index ETF  – tracks the Hang Seng SmallCap Index
 3160.HK BMO MSCI Japan Hedged to USD ETF - tracks MSCI Japan 100% Hedged to USD Index
 3161.HK XIE Shares FTSE Chimerica ETF – tracks the FTSE China N Shares All Cap Capped Net Tax Index
 3162.HK iShares MSCI China A International Index ETF – tracks the MSCI China A International Index
 3165.HK BMO MSCI Europe Quality Hedged to USD ETF – tracks the MSCI Europe Quality 100% Hedged to USD Index
 (Delisted) 3169.HK Vanguard Total China Index ETF - tracks the FTSE Total China Connect Index
 3171.HK ComStage 1 DAX UCITS ETF – tracks the DAX TR Index (performance index)
 3177.HK ComStage 1 DivDAX UCITS ETF – tracks the DivDAX Index (price index)
 3188.HK ChinaAMC CSI 300 Index ETF - tracks the CSI 300 Index
 9072.HK Nikko AM Global Internet ETF-U – tracks the iEdge-Factset Global Internet Index 
 82822.HK CSOP FTSE China A50 ETF - tracks the FTSE China A50 Index
 82828.HK Hang Seng H-Share ETF – tracks the Hang Seng China Enterprises Index
 82833.HK Hang Seng HSI ETF – tracks the Hang Seng Index
 83012.HK AMUNDI Hang Seng HK 35 Index ETF - tracks the AMUNDI Hang Seng HK 35 Index ETF
 83095.HK Value China A-Share ETF - tracks the FTSE Value-Stocks China A-Share Index
 83100.HK E Fund CSI 100 A-Share Index ETF – tracks the CSI 100 Index
 83118.HK Harvest MSCI China A Index ETF - tracks the MSCI China A Index
 83127.HK Horizons CSI300 Real Estate Index ETF – tracks the CSI 300 Index
 83128.HK Hang Seng China A Industry Top Index ETF - tracks the Hang Seng China A Industry Top Index
 83129.HK CSOP China CSI 300 smart ETF - tracks the China CSI 300 smart Index
 83147.HK CSOP SZSE ChiNext ETF  – tracks the SZSE ChiNext Index
 83150.HK Harvest CSI Smallcap 500 Index ETF  – tracks the CSI Smallcap 500 Index
 83156.HK GFI MSCI China A International ETF  – tracks the MSCI China A International Index
 83162.HK iShares MSCI China A International Index ETF – tracks the MSCI China A International Index
 83188.HK ChinaAMC CSI 300 Index ETF - tracks the CSI 300 Index
 3186:HK CICC KraneShares CSI China Internet Index Etf - tracks the CSI Overseas China Internet Index

Synthetic
 2816.HK db x-trackers CSI300 Real Estate Index ETF – tracks the CSI300 Real Estate Index
 2823.HK iShares FTSE A50 China Index ETF – tracks the FTSE China A50 Index
 2827.HK W.I.S.E. - CSI 300 China Tracker – tracks the CSI 300 Index
 2846.HK iShares CSI 300 A-Share Index ETF - tracks the CSI 300 Index
 3009.HK db x-trackers MSCI EMERGING MARKETS INDEX UCITS ETF - tracks the MSCI Total Return Net Emerging Markets Index
 3013.HK db x-trackers MSCI AC Asia Ex Jap H Div Yield Idx UCITS ETF - tracks the MSCI AC Asia ex Japan High Dividend Yield Index
 3019.HK db x-trackers MSCI WORLD INDEX UCITS ETF - tracks the MSCI Total Return Net World Index
 3020.HK db x-trackers MSCI USA INDEX UCITS ETF - tracks the MSCI Total Return Net USA Index
 3027.HK db x-trackers MSCI RUSSIA CAPPED INDEX UCITS ETF - tracks the MSCI Russia Capped Index
 3035.HK db x-trackers MSCI EM ASIA INDEX UCITS ETF - tracks the MSCI Total Return Net Emerging Markets Asia Index
 3049.HK db x-trackers CSI300 UCITS ETF - tracks the CSI 300 Index
 3087.HK db x-trackers FTSE Vietnam UCITS ETF
 3105.HK db x-trackers MSCI Bangladesh IM Index UCITS ETF - tracks the MSCI Bangladesh Investable Market Total Return Net Index
 3106.HK db x-trackers MSCI Pakistan IM Index UCITS ETF - tracks the MSCI Pakistan Investable Market Total Return Net Index

Bond ETFs
 2808.HK E Fund Citi Chinese Government Bond 5-10 Years Index ETF - tracks Citi Chinese Government Bond 5-10 Years Index
 2819.HK ABF HK IDX ETF – tracks the iBoxx ABF Hong Kong Index
 2821.HK ABF Pan Asia Bond Index Fund – tracks the iBoxx ABF Pan-Asia Index
 3122.HK CSOP China Ultra Short-Term Bond ETF – tracks the Citi Chinese Government and Policy Bank Bond 0-1 Year Select Index
 09141.HK BMO Asia USD Investment Grade Bond ETF – tracks the Barclays Asia USD Investment Grade Bond Index
 09199.HK CSOP China 5-year Treasury Bond ETF – tracks the China Bond 5-year Treasury Bond Index
 82808.HK E Fund Citi Chinese Government Bond 5-10 Years Index ETF - tracks Citi Chinese Government Bond 5-10 Years Index
 83122.HK CSOP China Ultra Short-Term Bond ETF – tracks the Citi Chinese Government and Policy Bank Bond 0-1 Year Select Index
 83199.HK CSOP China 5-year Treasury Bond ETF – tracks the China Bond 5-year Treasury Bond Index
 3079.HK Bloomberg Barclays China Treasury 1-10 Years Index

Commodity ETFs
 2840.HK SPDR GOLD TRUST – tracks the Gold Price
 3081.HK Value Gold ETF - tracks the London Gold Fixing Price in USD (A.M.)
 83081.HK Value Gold ETF - tracks the London Gold Fixing Price in USD (A.M.)
 83168.HK Hang Seng RMB Gold ETF – tracks the London Gold Fixing Price

Money Market
 3026.HK db x-trackers II AUSTRALIAN DOLLAR CASH UCITS ETF - tracks the Deutsche Bank AUSTRALIA OVERNIGHT MONEY MARKET TOTAL RETURN INDEX
 9096.HK (USD) CSOP US Dollar Money Market ETF - Benchmarked with the FTSE 3-Month US Dollar Eurodeposit Index
 3096.HK (HKD) CSOP US Dollar Money Market ETF - Benchmarked with the FTSE 3-Month US Dollar Eurodeposit Index

References

External links
List of ETFs and Trading Arrangements

See also
List of exchange-traded funds
List of American exchange-traded funds

Hong Kong